WRQR-FM (105.5 MHz, "Rocky 105.5") is a radio station licensed to Paris, Tennessee and serves Paris, McKenzie, Tennessee, and Murray, Kentucky. It broadcasts a classic rock format. The station is owned and operated by Forever Media, through licensee Forever South Licenses, LLC. The syndicated Ace & TJ Show is carried weekday mornings.

On February 3, 2020, WRQR-FM changed their format from top 40/CHR to classic rock, branded as "Rocky 105.5".

Previous logo

References

External links
 
 

RQR-FM
RQR-FM
Radio stations established in 1967
1967 establishments in Tennessee
Paris, Tennessee